Sander Gillé and Joran Vliegen were the defending champions but chose not to defend their title.

Denys Molchanov and Aleksandr Nedovyesov won the title after defeating Sander Arends and Luis David Martínez 7–6(7–5), 6–1 in the final.

Seeds

Draw

References

External links
 Main draw

Bratislava Open - Doubles